Milton "Mel" Stewart (September 19, 1929 – February 24, 2002) was an American character actor, television director, and musician who appeared in numerous films and television shows from the 1960s to the 1990s. He is best known for playing Henry Jefferson on All in the Family and for playing section chief Billy Melrose on the television series Scarecrow and Mrs. King. Stewart is sometimes credited as Melvin Stewart or Mel Stuart.

Career
Mel Stewart began his acting career in 1959 with small roles in TV and films. In the early 1960s, Stewart also appeared in the Broadway shows Purlie Victorious, The Hostage, The Cool World, and Simply Heavenly.

Stewart's early career also included notable work as a voice actor. He provided the narration for "Scenes in the City", a long jazz composition with a text by Lonne Elder and Langston Hughes that appeared on Charles Mingus' 1957 album A Modern Jazz Symposium of Music and Poetry. In 1961, Stewart recorded an album of Langston Hughes' poetry on Folkways Records: Langston Hughes' The Best of Simple. He was also a member of the San Francisco-based improv group, The Committee and appeared in 1969 on The Dick Cavett Show.

Stewart went on to land roles in various television series including That Girl, Marcus Welby, M.D., The Bob Newhart Show, Good Times, and Harry O. One of his most memorable roles was as Henry Jefferson, George Jefferson's brother, in three seasons of the series All in the Family. In 1973, he co-starred in the short-lived series Roll Out. The following year, Stewart directed two episodes of another short-lived series Get Christie Love!, then co-starred in On the Rocks. After On the Rocks was canceled in 1976, Stewart portrayed the role of Marvin Decker in the Bewitched spin-off series Tabitha from 1977 to 1978.

In the 1980s, Stewart starred on Scarecrow and Mrs. King as section chief Billy Melrose during the show's four-year run from 1983 through 1987, and continued guest starring in both television and films. His last on-screen appearance came in the 1993 film Made in America, starring Whoopi Goldberg and Ted Danson.

Side projects
In addition to acting and directing, Stewart was an accomplished jazz saxophonist. A longtime resident of San Francisco, he also taught acting at San Francisco State University. His students included actor Danny Glover.

He established the theater group Black Actors Now Through Unity (BANTU) and directed plays at the Center for African and African-American Art and Culture in San Francisco and the Black Repertory Theater in Berkeley, California.

A third degree black belt in aikido, Stewart opened a dojo for inner-city youth in the Bayview district of San Francisco.

Personal life and death
On July 11, 1976, Stewart married Annie Dong. The couple had one child together, a daughter. On February 24, 2002, Mel Stewart died of Alzheimer's disease.

Filmography

References

External links

 
 
 

1929 births
2002 deaths
American male film actors
American jazz musicians
American male stage actors
American television directors
Deaths from dementia in California
Deaths from Alzheimer's disease
Male actors from Cleveland
People from Pacifica, California
Male actors from San Francisco
African-American male actors
American male television actors
20th-century American musicians
San Francisco State University faculty
Jazz musicians from San Francisco
20th-century American male actors
Jazz musicians from Ohio
20th-century African-American musicians
21st-century African-American people